Recurve may refer to any of several things named for the notion of curving back: 

 Recurve (landform), the hook at the tip of a coastal spit
 Recurve bow, a type of bow used in archery
 A knife blade shape with a concave portion, often exemplified by a kukri

See also
 Reverse curve
S Curve (disambiguation)